The Minister for Economic Affairs is a Danish ministerial title, following a split from the Minister for Finance. The position was at a point joined with the Minister of Business Affairs.

List of ministers

References

Lists of government ministers of Denmark
Government ministerial offices of Denmark
1947 establishments in Denmark